Bart K. Palaszewski (born May 30, 1983) is a retired Polish-American professional mixed martial artist who most recently competed in the UFC's Featherweight division. A professional competitor from 2002 until 2014, Palaszewski has also formerly competed for the WEC, the Quad Cities Silverbacks of the IFL, and King of the Cage.

Background
Palaszewski was born in Warsaw, Poland and lived there until he was 13 years old when he and his family immigrated to Wonder Lake, Illinois. In Poland, he was a "punching bag" for his older cousin who was involved in kickboxing, and Palaszewski also began judo when he was in the third grade. However, his coach became an Olympian and after Palaszewski was not happy with his old coach's replacement, he trained for six months in Brazilian jiu-jitsu and Muay Thai before being introduced to mixed martial arts. He trained whilst working as a photographer and graphic designer and holding other computer-related jobs. Then, after seeing his first MMA event at a show in McHenry, Illinois, Palaszewski was hooked. Although his official record indicates that he lost his first four professional fights, he claims that he had other wins professionally but only the four losses were documented when his coach sent in the results. Nevertheless, he then bounced back with eight consecutive victories.

Mixed martial arts career

World Extreme Cagefighting
Palaszewski made his WEC debut against Alex Karalexis at WEC 37. He won the fight via second round TKO, earning Knockout of the Night honors.

Palaszewski suffered back to back losses against Ricardo Lamas via unanimous decision at WEC 39, and Anthony Njokuani via second round at WEC 40. The loss to Njokuani is to this date the only TKO/KO loss of his career.

Palaszewski fought touted prospect Anthony Pettis on December 19, 2009 at WEC 45. He gave Pettis his first professional loss via split decision.

Palaszewski defeated Karen Darabedyan via first round submission at WEC 47.

Palaszewski faced Zach Micklewright on August 18, 2010 at WEC 50. He won the fight via TKO in the second round.

Palaszewski was expected to face Kamal Shalorus on November 11, 2010 at WEC 52., but the bout was moved to WEC 53 after Shalorus suffered a hand injury. Palaszewski lost to Shalorus via a split decision.

Ultimate Fighting Championship
In October 2010, World Extreme Cagefighting merged with the Ultimate Fighting Championship. As part of the merger, most WEC fighters were transferred to the UFC.

Palaszewski was expected to face Cody McKenzie on May 28, 2011 at UFC 130.  However, McKenzie was forced out of the bout with an injury and replaced by Gleison Tibau.  Palaszewski himself was forced from the Tibau bout with an injury and replaced by Rafaello Oliveira.

Palaszewski returned to face Tyson Griffin in a featherweight bout on October 29, 2011 at UFC 137. Palaszewski won via first-round KO after dropping Griffin with a left hook and finishing the fight with a flurry of punches against the cage, earning Knockout of the Night honors.

Palaszewski faced Hatsu Hioki on February 26, 2012 at UFC 144.  Hioki defeated Palaszewski via unanimous decision.

Palaszewski faced Diego Nunes on October 5, 2012 at UFC on FX 5., losing via unanimous decision (30-27, 29-28, 30-27). Despite the loss, he still earned the "Fight of the Night" bonus.

Palaszewski faced Cole Miller on April 13, 2013 at The Ultimate Fighter 17 Finale. Palaszewski lost the fight via submission in the first round and was subsequently released from the promotion.

On February in 2014, Palaszewski announced his retirement from mixed martial arts competition.

Personal life

Championships and achievements
Ultimate Fighting Championship
Knockout of the Night (One time) vs. Tyson Griffin 
Fight of the Night (One time) vs. Diego Nunes 
World Extreme Cagefighting
Knockout of the Night (One time) vs. Alex Karalexis

Mixed martial arts record

|-
| Loss
| align=center| 36–17
| Cole Miller
| Submission (rear-naked choke)
| The Ultimate Fighter 17 Finale
| 
| align=center| 1
| align=center| 4:23
| Las Vegas, Nevada, United States
| 
|-
| Loss
| align=center| 36–16
| Diego Nunes
| Decision (unanimous)
| UFC on FX: Browne vs. Bigfoot
| 
| align=center| 3
| align=center| 5:00
| Minneapolis, Minnesota, United States
| 
|-
| Loss
| align=center| 36–15
| Hatsu Hioki
| Decision (unanimous)
| UFC 144
| 
| align=center| 3
| align=center| 5:00
| Saitama, Saitama, Japan
| 
|-
| Win
| align=center| 36–14
| Tyson Griffin
| KO (punches)
| UFC 137
| 
| align=center| 1
| align=center| 2:45
| Las Vegas, Nevada, United States
| 
|-
| Loss
| align=center| 35–14
| Kamal Shalorus
| Decision (split)
| WEC 53
| 
| align=center| 3
| align=center| 5:00
| Glendale, Arizona, United States
| 
|-
| Win
| align=center| 35–13
| Zach Micklewright
| KO (punch)
| WEC 50
| 
| align=center| 2
| align=center| 0:31
| Las Vegas, Nevada, United States
| 
|-
| Win
| align=center| 34–13
| Karen Darabedyan
| Submission (armbar)
| WEC 47
| 
| align=center| 1
| align=center| 4:40
| Columbus, Ohio, United States
| 
|-
| Win
| align=center| 33–13
| Anthony Pettis
| Decision (split)
| WEC 45
| 
| align=center| 3
| align=center| 5:00
| Las Vegas, Nevada, United States
| 
|-
| Win
| align=center| 32–13
| Tyler Combs
| TKO (punches)
| Xtreme Fighting Organization 32
| 
| align=center| 2
| align=center| 3:48
| New Munster, Wisconsin, United States
| 
|-
| Loss
| align=center| 31–13
| Anthony Njokuani
| TKO (punches)
| WEC 40
| 
| align=center| 2
| align=center| 0:27
| Chicago, Illinois, United States
| 
|-
| Loss
| align=center| 31–12
| Ricardo Lamas
| Decision (unanimous)
| WEC 39
| 
| align=center| 3
| align=center| 5:00
| Corpus Christi, Texas, United States
| 
|-
| Win
| align=center| 31–11
| Alex Karalexis
| TKO (punches)
| WEC 37: Torres vs. Tapia
| 
| align=center| 2
| align=center| 1:11
| Las Vegas, Nevada, United States
| 
|-
| Win
| align=center| 30–11
| Jeff Cox
| TKO (punches)
| Adrenaline MMA: Guida vs. Russow
| 
| align=center| 2
| align=center| 3:07
| Chicago, Illinois, United States
| 
|-
| Loss
| align=center| 29–11
| Jim Miller
| Decision (unanimous)
| IFL: New Jersey
| 
| align=center| 3
| align=center| 4:00
| East Rutherford, New Jersey, United States
| 
|-
| Loss
| align=center| 29–10
| Chris Horodecki
| Decision (split)
| IFL: World Grand Prix Semifinals
| 
| align=center| 3
| align=center| 4:00
| Hoffman Estates, Illinois, United States
| 
|-
| Loss
| align=center| 29–9
| Deividas Taurosevicius
| Technical Submission (armbar)
| IFL: 2007 Team Championship Final
| 
| align=center| 2
| align=center| 1:30
| Hollywood, Florida, United States
| 
|-
| Win
| align=center| 29–8
| Harris Sarmiento
| Submission (guillotine choke)
| IFL: 2007 Semifinals
| 
| align=center| 3
| align=center| 1:06
| East Rutherford, New Jersey, United States
| 
|-
| Win
| align=center| 28–8
| John Strawn
| KO (punch)
| IFL: Chicago
| 
| align=center| 1
| align=center| 0:48
| Hoffman Estates, Illinois, United States
| 
|-
| Win
| align=center| 27–8
| John Gunderson
| Decision (split)
| IFL: Moline
| 
| align=center| 3
| align=center| 4:00
| Moline, Illinois, United States
| 
|-
| Loss
| align=center| 26–8
| Chris Horodecki
| Decision (split)
| IFL: Houston
| 
| align=center| 3
| align=center| 4:00
| Houston, Texas, United States
| 
|-
| Win
| align=center| 26–7
| Ryan Schultz
| KO (punch)
| IFL: Championship Final
| 
| align=center| 3
| align=center| 2:16
| Uncasville, Connecticut, United States
| 
|-
| Win
| align=center| 25–7
| Ivan Menjivar
| Decision (split)
| IFL: World Championship Semifinals
| 
| align=center| 3
| align=center| 4:00
| Portland, Oregon, United States
| 
|-
| Win
| align=center| 24–7
| Marcio Feitosa
| Decision (split)
| IFL: Gracie vs. Miletich
| 
| align=center| 3
| align=center| 4:00
| Moline, Illinois, United States
| 
|-
| Win
| align=center| 23–7
| Steve Bruno
| KO (punch)
| IFL: Championship 2006
| 
| align=center| 1
| align=center| 1:48
| Atlantic City, New Jersey, United States
| 
|-
| Win
| align=center| 22–7
| John Shackelford
| TKO (punches)
| IFL: Legends Championship 2006
| 
| align=center| 2
| align=center| 1:31
| Atlantic City, New Jersey, United States
| 
|-
| Win
| align=center| 21–7
| Jay Ellis
| Submission (triangle choke)
| XFO 10: Explosion
| 
| align=center| 1
| align=center| 1:43
| Lakemoor, Illinois, United States
| 
|-
| Win
| align=center| 20–7
| Wayne Weems
| TKO (punches)
| KOTC: Redemption on the River
| 
| align=center| 1
| align=center| 1:11
| Moline, Illinois, United States
| 
|-
| Win
| align=center| 19–7
| Kyle Brees
| Submission (armbar)
| Xtreme Fighting Organization 8
| 
| align=center| 2
| align=center| 2:41
| Lakemoor, Illinois, United States
| 
|-
| Win
| align=center| 18–7
| Luke Spencer
| Submission (guillotine choke)
| Gracie Fighting Challenge
| 
| align=center| 1
| align=center| N/A
| Columbus, Ohio, United States
| 
|-
| Win
| align=center| 17–7
| Kyle Watson
| KO (punches)
| Total Fight Challenge 4
| 
| align=center| 1
| align=center| 0:25
| Hammond, Indiana, United States
| 
|-
| Win
| align=center| 16–7
| Josh Koon
| KO (punches)
| XFO 7: Outdoor War
| 
| align=center| 1
| align=center| 0:48
| Island Lake, Illinois, United States
| 
|-
| Loss
| align=center| 15–7
| Clay Guida
| Decision (unanimous)
| XFO 6: Judgement Day
| 
| align=center| 3
| align=center| 5:00
| Lakemoor, Illinois, United States
| 
|-
| Win
| align=center| 15–6
| Andrew Chappelle
| Decision (unanimous)
| SuperBrawl 40
| 
| align=center| 3
| align=center| 5:00
| Hammond, Indiana, United States
| 
|-
| Win
| align=center| 14–6
| Joe Jordan
| Decision (unanimous)
| Xtreme Fighting Organization 5
| 
| align=center| 3
| align=center| 5:00
| Lakemoor, Illinois, United States
| 
|-
| Win
| align=center| 13–6
| Ryan Ackerman
| KO (punches)
| Madtown Throwdown 2
| 
| align=center| N/A
| align=center| N/A
| Madison, Wisconsin, United States
| 
|-
| Win
| align=center| 12–6
| Luke Caudillo
| Submission (guillotine choke)
| Combat: Do Fighting Challenge 2
| 
| align=center| N/A
| align=center| N/A
| Illinois, United States
| 
|-
| Win
| align=center| 11–6
| Virgil Strzelecki
| KO (punch)
| XFO 4: International
| 
| align=center| 1
| align=center| 0:51
| McHenry, Illinois, United States
| 
|-
| Loss
| align=center| 10–6
| Gesias Cavalcante
| Submission (guillotine choke)
| IHC 8: Ethereal
| 
| align=center| 1
| align=center| 1:03
| Hammond, Indiana, United States
| 
|-
| Win
| align=center| 10–5
| Jay Estrada
| Submission (triangle choke)
| Xtreme Fighting Organization 3
| 
| align=center| 1
| align=center| 4:31
| McHenry, Illinois, United States
| 
|-
| Win
| align=center| 9–5
| Masayuki Okude
| KO (punch)
| Zst 6
| 
| align=center| 1
| align=center| 2:27
| Tokyo, Japan
| 
|-
| Loss
| align=center| 8–5
| Kolo Koka
| Decision (unanimous)
| SuperBrawl 36
| 
| align=center| 3
| align=center| 3:00
| Honolulu, Hawaii, United States
| 
|-
| Win
| align=center| 8–4
| Komei Okada
| TKO (punches)
| SuperBrawl 35
| 
| align=center| 3
| align=center| 3:02
| Honolulu, Hawaii, United States
| 
|-
| Win
| align=center| 7–4
| Tim Newland
| Submission (armbar)
| XFO 1: The Kickoff
| 
| align=center| 1
| align=center| 4:47
| Fontana, Wisconsin, United States
| 
|-
| Win
| align=center| 6–4
| Mark Long
| Submission (armbar)
| Extreme Challenge 55
| 
| align=center| 1
| align=center| 1:39
| Lakemoor, Illinois, United States
| 
|-
| Win
| align=center| 5–4
| Jason Bender
| Decision (unanimous)
| IHC 6: Inferno
| 
| align=center| 2
| align=center| 5:00
| Lakemoor, Illinois, United States
| 
|-
| Win
| align=center| 4–4
| Jay Estrada
| TKO
| Extreme Challenge 54
| 
| align=center| 3
| align=center| 3:23
| Lakemoor, Illinois, United States
| 
|-
| Win
| align=center| 3–4
| Tom Kirk
| Decision (unanimous)
| Extreme Challenge 51
| 
| align=center| 3
| align=center| 5:00
| St. Charles, Illinois, United States
| 
|-
| Win
| align=center| 2–4
| Kendrick Johnson
| TKO (submission to punches)
| Shooto: Midwest Fighting
| 
| align=center| 1
| align=center| 2:10
| Hammond, Indiana, United States
| 
|-
| Win
| align=center| 1–4
| Carlos Armanqui Concha
| Submission (armbar)
| ICC 2: Rebellion
| 
| align=center| 2
| align=center| 3:40
| Minneapolis, Minnesota, United States
| 
|-
| Loss
| align=center| 0–4
| Darrell Smith
| Decision
| Freestyle Combat Challenge 9
| 
| align=center| 3
| align=center| 5:00
| Racine, Wisconsin, United States
| 
|-
| Loss
| align=center| 0–3
| Brian Szohr
| Decision
| TCC: Battle of the Badges
| 
| align=center| 1
| align=center| 15:00
| Hammond, Indiana, United States
| 
|-
| Loss
| align=center| 0–2
| Jim Bruketta
| Decision
| River Plex Rumble
| 
| align=center| 3
| align=center| 5:00
| Peoria, Illinois, United States
| 
|-
| Loss
| align=center| 0–1
| Cole Escovedo
| TKO (submission to punches)
| UA 1: The Genesis
| 
| align=center| 1
| align=center| 2:10
| Hammond, Indiana, United States
|

Amateur mixed martial arts record

|Win
|align=center| 2–0
|Cleve Tuttle
|Submission (armbar)
|Nationals: MMA Nationals 2002
|
|align=center| 2
|align=center| 2:27
|Davenport, Iowa, United States
|
|-
|Win
|align=center| 1–0
|Gin Minajev
|Submission (triangle choke)
|Nationals: MMA Nationals 2002
|
|align=center| 2
|align=center| 4:16
|Davenport, Iowa, United States
|

References

External links
Official UFC Profile

 Official Myspace Page

Living people
1983 births
American male mixed martial artists
Polish male mixed martial artists
Lightweight mixed martial artists
Mixed martial artists utilizing Muay Thai
Mixed martial artists utilizing Brazilian jiu-jitsu
American practitioners of Brazilian jiu-jitsu
Polish practitioners of Brazilian jiu-jitsu
People awarded a black belt in Brazilian jiu-jitsu
Polish Muay Thai practitioners
American Muay Thai practitioners
Polish emigrants to the United States
People from McHenry County, Illinois
Sportspeople from Warsaw
Ultimate Fighting Championship male fighters